Conquering Lion may refer to:
 the Lion of Judah
 Rebel MC, an English jungle producer and toaster
 Conquering Lion Pictures, a Canadian independent film production company
 Conquering Lion, a dub/reggae/crossover band from Macedonia.